Ella and Louis is a studio album by Ella Fitzgerald and Louis Armstrong, accompanied by the Oscar Peterson Quartet, released in October 1956. Having previously collaborated in the late 1940s for the Decca label, this was the first of three albums that Fitzgerald and Armstrong were to record together for Verve Records, later followed by 1957's Ella and Louis Again and 1959's Porgy and Bess.

The album
Norman Granz, the founder of the Verve label, selected eleven ballads for Fitzgerald and Armstrong, mainly played in a slow or moderate tempo. Recording began August 16, 1956, at the new Capitol Studios in Hollywood. Though Granz produced the album, Armstrong was given final say over songs and keys.

The success of Ella and Louis was replicated by Ella and Louis Again and Porgy and Bess. All three were released as The Complete Ella Fitzgerald & Louis Armstrong on Verve. Verve also released the album as one of the first ones in SACD.

Reception

AllMusic's Scott Yanow wrote, "Ella Fitzgerald and Louis Armstrong make for a charming team on this CD… This is primarily a vocal set with the emphasis on tasteful renditions of ballads." Jasen and Jones called the set a "pinnacle of popular singing". The Penguin Guide to Jazz, compiled by Richard Cook and Brian Morton, says that while the approaches of Armstrong and Fitzgerald may not have been entirely compatible, the results are "hard to resist", and awards the album three and a half stars.

In 2000 it was voted number 636 in Colin Larkin's All Time Top 1000 Albums.

Björk chose the album as one of her favourites in a 1993 Q feature. "I love the way Ella and Louis work together," she remarked. "They were opposites in how they sung, but were still completely functional together, and respectful of each other."

Track listing

Side one

Side two

Personnel
Ella Fitzgerald – vocals
Louis Armstrong – vocals, trumpet
Oscar Peterson – piano
Herb Ellis – guitar
Ray Brown – bass
Buddy Rich – drums

Additional personnel
Val Valentin – session engineer
Phil Stern – photography

Charts

Sources

Ella Fitzgerald albums
Louis Armstrong albums
1956 albums
Verve Records albums
Vocal duet albums
Albums produced by Norman Granz
Albums recorded at Capitol Studios